UDP-N-acetylmuramoyl-L-alanyl-D-glutamate—D-lysine ligase (UDP-MurNAc-L-Ala-D-Glu:D-Lys ligase, D-lysine-adding enzyme) is an enzyme with systematic name UDP-N-acetylmuramoyl-L-alanyl-D-glutamate:D-lysine alpha-ligase (ADP-forming). This enzyme catalyses the following chemical reaction

 ATP + UDP-N-acetylmuramoyl-L-alanyl-D-glutamate + D-lysine  ADP + phosphate + UDP-N-acetylmuramoyl-L-alanyl-D-glutamyl-D-lysine

The enzyme from Thermotoga maritima also performs the reaction of EC 6.3.2.7.

References

External links 
 

EC 6.3.2